Perittia lonicerae, the honeysuckle leaf miner, is a moth of the family Elachistidae. It was first discovered in Hawaii in 1949. It was later found in Japan in 1982, although it was described as new. Several other species are known from the eastern Palearctic Region, so it is likely that P. lonicerae originated there instead of Hawaii where it was first found.

The larvae feed on Lonicera japonica. They mine the leaves of their host plant. There is usually only one mine per leaf, but occasionally two mines will be found in a single leaf. The mine starts near the margin of the upper surface of the leaf. The slender mine follows the leaf margin for some distance, enlarges gradually, forms an extensive blotch by expanding towards the middle of the leaf, and often doubles back along the slender part of the mine. The full-grown larva has a reddish tint, the head is dark and the pronotum has two wide, dark vittae.

The pupa is about 4 mm long. The pupal period takes three weeks. The larva separates the epidermis from the other leaf tissues to form a kind of pocket in which pupation takes place.

External links

Elachistidae
Leaf miners
Endemic moths of Hawaii
Moths of Japan
Moths described in 1950